Edward Henry Ryan (17 July 1921 – 5 May 1960) was an Australian rules footballer who played with Collingwood in the Victorian Football League (VFL).

Ryan, who went to Xavier College, was cleared to Collingwood from Williamstown, in the Victorian Football Association. In 1941, his debut season, Ryan was one of five Collingwood players to appear in all 18 rounds. Due to wartime service in the Royal Australian Air Force he did not play senior football again until 1944, when he made 11 appearances while on leave. A defender, Ryan played four more games, two in 1946 and another two in 1947.

Midway through the 1948 season, Ryan rejoined Williamstown, then in 1949 crossed to Stawell, where he was based on weekends, through his work as a truck driver. His brother, Phil, played for Hawthorn.

References

1921 births
1960 deaths
Australian rules footballers from Melbourne
Collingwood Football Club players
Williamstown Football Club players
Stawell Football Club players
Royal Australian Air Force personnel of World War II
People from Kew, Victoria
Military personnel from Melbourne
People educated at Xavier College